Afterglow is the fifth studio album by Canadian singer-songwriter Sarah McLachlan. Released on 4 November 2003, on Nettwerk in Canada and 4 November 2003, on Arista Records in the United States, it was her first album of new material in six years, after the success of Surfacing and the Lilith Fair festival.

Unlike past albums where she went to an isolated cottage to write the songs, she wrote the songs for Afterglow in her family home mainly before the birth of her child. She wrote the songs entirely on piano, which was also a departure from her previous albums which she wrote on guitar. Longtime collaborator Pierre Marchand produced the album. McLachlan wrote eight of the 10 songs herself and co-wrote the other two with Marchand.

The song "Answer" was featured in the 2007 movie The Brave One. It has also been used in television commercials for the ASPCA, with McLachlan appearing in person.

Critical reception
Afterglow was met with "mixed or average" reviews from critics. At Metacritic, which assigns a weighted average rating out of 100 to reviews from mainstream publications, this release received an average score of 55 based on 11 reviews.

Commercial performance and award nominations 
Afterglow was released on 4 November 2003, and was a success in North America, reaching number two on the Billboard 200, topping the Canadian Albums Chart and selling 361,000 copies in its first week of release. It reached #33 in the UK (McLachlan's biggest success there thus far) and the top 50 in Australia in 2004. The first single, "Fallen", reached the top ten on the Adult Top 40 Billboard charts and a remix reached top ten in the United States dance charts. A second single, "Stupid" was released in March 2004.

McLachlan was nominated in five Juno Award categories in Canada, including Album of the Year and Pop Album of the Year for Afterglow, and Songwriter of the Year for the songs on the album. The awards were announced on 4 April 2004. The album was also nominated for a Grammy Award in the Best Pop Vocal Album field in 2005.

Although not as successful as Surfacing, Afterglow has sold over 2.3 million copies in the US (as of November 2004) and went two times platinum. Worldwide, the album has sold more than four million copies (as of October 2006).

Track listing

Personnel
 Sarah McLachlan – vocals, electric guitar, piano, Rhodes piano, keyboards
 Sean Ashby – guitar
 Michel Pepin – guitar
Pete Caigan – engineering
 Michael Chaves – guitar
 Jim Creeggan – acoustic bass
Yanick Daunais – engineering
 Bill Dillon – guitar, guitorgan, church organ
 Yves Desrosiers – guitar
Kharen Hill – photography
Brian Hogue – engineering
 Ethan Johns – guitar
 Jorane – cello, background vocals, vocal treatments
 Mark Jowett – guitar
 David Kershaw – Hammond organ
 Daryl Johnson – bass guitar
 Tony Levin – bass guitar
Roman Klun – engineering
 Bob Ludwig – mastering
 Pierre Marchand – guitar, bass guitar, piano, keyboards, synthesizer bass, production, engineering, mixing
 Jerry Marotta – percussion
John Oliviera – engineering
 Chis Potter – engineering, mixing
 Ashwin Sood – drums, percussion, loops, keyboard bass
Linda Strawberry – engineering

Charts

Weekly charts

Year-end charts

Certifications and sales

References

2003 albums
Sarah McLachlan albums
Nettwerk Records albums
Arista Records albums
Albums produced by Pierre Marchand
Juno Award for Pop Album of the Year albums